In Chile, universidades tradicionales ("traditional universities") is the group of universities founded before the 1980s.  It usually includes universities derived from traditional ones.  A more precise term is Universidades del Consejo de Rectores (Universities of the Rectors' Council).

Overview 

Chilean Traditional Universities is not a specific term since it reflects only the history of a given university and is not a valid description of the university itself or of the way that university is organized. For example, even though the Universidad Católica refers to itself as a "traditional university", it is more correctly described as a "private Catholic university" (e.g. the Catholic University of Leuven), as the government, and the people in extension, do not intervene in the governance of the university.

This distinction (which is not found in most countries) was needed because the Pinochet regime changed the higher education system, effectively dismembering public universities (like the Universidad de Chile or the Universidad Técnica del Estado) and Catholic universities. This decision, which can be seen as a punitive action against highly "unstable" institutions, or as a mean for better control, also included the opening of the education market, effectively allowing any private citizen to establish a higher education institution. Several small private universities arose after this, most of them directly linked to the dictatorship government members.

These "traditional" universities receive state financial support through many means—even though many of these universities are not public—receiving as they do most of the better students and doing most of the research undertaken by Chilean universities.

Current division or classification of traditional universities in Chile 
These universities can be divided into two groups:

Properly traditional universities, the eight universities existing in 1981: Universidad de Chile, Pontificia Universidad Católica de Chile, Pontificia Universidad Católica de Valparaíso, Universidad Austral de Chile, Universidad Católica del Norte, Universidad de Concepción, Universidad de Santiago de Chile (formerly Universidad Técnica del Estado) and Universidad Técnica Federico Santa María.
 Derivative universities: Universities formed by separating a faculty or campus from a traditional one or by merging two campuses, one belonging to Universidad de Chile and the other, to Universidad Técnica del Estado.  For example, what now is the Universidad Metropolitana de Ciencias de la Educación in 1981 was the Education Faculty of the University of Chile; the present-day Universidad de La Frontera in 1981 was the University of Chile, Temuco Campus, and the Technical University of the State, Temuco Campus; and the present Universidad Católica de la Santísima Concepción in 1991 was the Pontificia Universidad Católica de Chile, Talcahuano campus.  The Universidad Tecnológica Metropolitana (known by its acronym, UTEM) was founded on August 30, 1993.

Currently, there are three types of universities in Chile, applicable to the traditional universities, and which classifies them according to specific characteristics:
 State-owned universities (universidades estatales). These are the Universidad de Chile, Universidad de Santiago de Chile and derivative universities, most of which were created in the 1980s from the regional campuses of the former two.
 Universities of the Catholic Church. Similarly to the regional estatales, some of these were created from the regional campuses of the Pontificia Universidad Católica de Chile in the 1970s, while others originated earlier as stand-alone universities.
 Three private universities, owned by non-profit foundations. These are the Universidad Austral de Chile and the Universidad de Concepción founded by the citizens respectively of Valdivia and Concepción, and the Universidad Técnica Federico Santa María, created, originally in Valparaíso, by the last will and testament of Federico Santa María Carrera.

Twenty-five traditional universities are today grouped in the Consejo de Rectores (Rectors' Council).  Since the 1970s, these universities have managed a common higher education admissions test known as the Prueba de Aptitud Académica ("scholastic-aptitude test") and, since 2003, as the Prueba de Selección Universitaria (PSU, "university-selection test").  Some of the more academically accomplished and/or ambitious new private universities, dating from the 1980s and chiefly set up by political groupings, Catholic sects or entrepreneurs, subscribe to PSU for all undergraduate admissions.

External links
 Consejo de Rectores de las Universidades Chilenas
 Chilean Traditional Universities in UniverSite.cl

Traditional universities